The 1976–77 Georgetown Hoyas men's basketball team represented Georgetown University during the 1976–77  NCAA Division I college basketball season. John Thompson, coached them in his fifth season as head coach. An independent, Georgetown played its home games at McDonough Gymnasium on the Georgetown campus in Washington, D.C., and finished the season with a record of 19-9. Knocked out of the ECAC South Region tournament for the first time in the semifinals, the team missed an NCAA tournament bid for the first time since 1974. The Hoyas instead appeared in the 1977 National Invitation Tournament (NIT), their first NIT appearance since 1970, and lost in the first round to Virginia Tech.

Season recap

Junior guard and perennial high scorer Derrick Jackson shot 198-for-404 (49.0%) from the field during the season and scored 400 points, virtually duplicating his performance from the previous season, when he had shot 195-for-399 (48.9%) from the field and scored 406 points. This season, he scored in double figures in 27 of 28 games and finished first in five scoring categories for the team.

Promising freshman forward Craig "Big Sky" Shelton missed all but seven games because of a knee injury and would not emerge as one of the teams stars until the following season. His high school teammate, freshman guard John Duren, however, became a starter by mid-season and showed his talent as a point guard and shooter. His ability to lead the team as point guard and pass the ball contributed to Georgetowns team shooting percentage rising from 46% to 50% during the year. He scored a season-high 19 points against Boston College and averaged 15 points per game after becoming a starter.

With the arrival of Duren, there was little need for sophomore Steve Martin to play as a guard – his position in high school and during his freshman year – so Thompson played him off the bench as a small forward this season. Martin made the most of the transition, scoring 15 against Purdue, 17 against Pennsylvania, and a season-high 20 against Seton Hall. He also came off the bench for an eight-point, six-steal game against Holy Cross.

Although retaining its status as an independent, Georgetown was in its third season as a member of the Eastern College Athletic Conference (ECAC), a loosely organized sports federation that held three regional post-season Division I basketball tournaments in 1977 for independent Eastern colleges and universities similar to the end-of-season conference tournaments held by conventional college basketball conferences, with each tournament winner receiving an at-large bid to the 1977 NCAA Division I men's basketball tournament. The Hoyas participated in the ECAC South Region tournament, which they had won in 1975 and 1976, facing Old Dominion in the semifinal. Junior Georgetown center Ed Hopkins, a key defensive presence also making a major offensive contribution by averaging 10.2 points and 8.4 rebounds per game and leading the team in shooting percentage from the field at 57%, missed the game because of an ankle injury. The Hoyas struggled without Hopkins and lost to Old Dominion 80-58. They therefore missed an NCAA tournament berth for the first time since the 1973-74 season.

Invited to the 1977 National Invitation Tournament instead, the Hoyas faced Virginia Tech in the first round. Sophomore forward Al Dutch, averaging 13.3 points and 7.8 rebounds per game for the season, had to sit out the game with an ankle injury. Georgetown missed Dutchs scoring and lost to the Hokies 83-79 despite Derrick Jackons 28-point performance, which tied his career-high 28 points scored against Penn State during the 1975-76 season. Senior forward Larry Long, often limited by injuries during his four years with the Hoyas, put in an impressive performance in the last two collegiate games of his career with a combined 28 rebounds in the Old Dominion and Virginia Tech games.

Roster

Junior guard Craig Esherick would later serve as an assistant coach for the Hoyas from 1982 to 1999 and as head coach from 1999 to 2004. Junior guard Mike Riley would later serve as a Hoya assistant coach from 1982 to 2004.

Source

Rankings

Sources

The team was not ranked in the Top 20 of the Associated Press Poll at any time, but it was ranked in the Top 20 in the Coaches' Poll during two weeks. This was only the second national ranking in Georgetown men's basketball history, and the first since the 1952-53 team spent a week at No. 20 in the AP Poll in January 1953.

1976–77 schedule and results

Sources
 All times are Eastern

|-
!colspan=9 style="background:#002147; color:#8D817B;"| Regular season

|-
!colspan=9 style="background:#002147; color:#8D817B;"| ECAC South Region tournament

|-
!colspan=9 style="background:#002147; color:#8D817B;"| National Invitation tournament

References

Georgetown Hoyas men's basketball seasons
Georgetown
Georgetown Hoyas
Georgetown Hoyas men's basketball team
Georgetown Hoyas men's basketball team